Julie Landsman (born April 3, 1953) is an American-born French horn player and teacher.  Landsman was Principal Horn of the Metropolitan Opera from 1985-2010. Prior to her appointment with the Metropolitan Opera Orchestra, Landsman served as co-principal horn with the Houston Symphony, and has toured internationally with the New York Philharmonic and Orpheus Chamber Orchestra.  Julie Landsman is on the faculties of The Juilliard School, the USC Thornton School of Music, and the Music Academy of the West. She formerly taught at the Bard College Conservatory of Music.

Her students hold prominent positions in orchestras throughout the world.   A graduate of Juilliard, her teachers have included James Chambers, Howard Howard and Carmine Caruso.  Landsman is featured horn soloist on the recording of Wagner's Ring Cycle with the Metropolitan Opera conducted by James Levine, and has appeared on numerous other recordings. Music festival appearances have included the Marlboro Music Festival, Sarasota Music Festival, Chamber Music Northwest, Santa Fe Chamber Music Festival, Aspen Music Festival and School, Mainly Mozart Orchestra, and La Jolla SummerFest. Landsman grew up in Brooklyn.

References 

American classical horn players
Women horn players
Living people
1953 births
Metropolitan Opera people
Juilliard School alumni
Juilliard School faculty
Bard College faculty
Musicians from Brooklyn
20th-century American musicians
20th-century classical musicians
21st-century American musicians
21st-century classical musicians
20th-century American women musicians
21st-century American women musicians
Women music educators
American women academics